is a passenger railway station  located in the city of Takarazuka, Hyōgo Prefecture, Japan. It is operated by the West Japan Railway Company (JR West).

Lines

Station layout
The station consists of two ground-level opposed side platforms connected to the station building by a footbridge. The station has a Midori no Madoguchi staffed ticket office.

Platforms

Adjacent stations

History
Nakayamadera Station opened on 27 December 1897, as  a station of Hankaku Railway, which was nationalized in 1907. It was renamed to its present name on 11 September 1915. With the privatization of the Japan National Railways (JNR) on 1 April 1987, the station came under the aegis of the West Japan Railway Company.

Station numbering was introduced in March 2018 with Nakayamadera being assigned station number JR-G55.

Passenger statistics
In fiscal 2016, the station was used by an average of 1318 passengers daily

Surrounding area
 Nakayama-dera Temple
Japan National Route 176

See also
List of railway stations in Japan

References

External links 

 Nakayamadera Station from JR-Odekake.net 

Railway stations in Hyōgo Prefecture
Railway stations in Japan opened in 1897
Takarazuka, Hyōgo